Andressa Fernandes Corrêa (born October 27, 1986) is a Brazilian judoka, who played for the half-lightweight category. She won three medals (one gold and two silver) for the extra- and half-lightweight categories at the South American Games.

Fernandes represented Brazil at the 2008 Summer Olympics in Beijing, where she competed for the women's 52 kg class. She received a last-minute place for the national team as a replacement for Erika Miranda, who immediately withdrew from the games because of a knee injury. With a short time of training and full preparation, Fernandes, however, lost the first preliminary match against Dominican Republic's María García, who was able to score a yuko within the five-minute period.

References

External links

Profile – UOL Esporte 
NBC Olympics Profile

Living people
Olympic judoka of Brazil
Judoka at the 2008 Summer Olympics
Sportspeople from São Paulo (state)
1986 births
Brazilian female judoka
South American Games gold medalists for Brazil
South American Games silver medalists for Brazil
South American Games medalists in judo
Competitors at the 2002 South American Games
Competitors at the 2006 South American Games
Competitors at the 2010 South American Games
21st-century Brazilian women